Codi Tyree Miller-McIntyre (born June 1, 1994) is an American-born naturalized Bulgarian professional basketball player for Gaziantep Basketbol of the Basketbol Süper Ligi and the FIBA Europe Cup. He also represents the Bulgarian national team internationally. Miller-McIntyre played four years of college basketball for Wake Forest University.

High school career
Miller-McIntyre first attended First Assembly Christian School in Concord, North Carolina, before he transferred to Hargrave Military Academy in Chatham, Virginia, where he led Hargrave to a 38-1 overall record. 

Rated as a four-star recruit in his class, Miller-McIntyre committed to Wake Forest University to play college basketball.

College career
Miller-McIntyre played four seasons of college basketball at Wake Forest. He averaged 9.4 points and four assists per game as a senior. However, the season was hampered after he suffered a fractured left foot in October 2016 and missed the first eight games. He finished with 1,329 points and 441 assists.

Freshman season: (2012–13)
On January 2, 2013, Miller-McIntyre scored 16 points and 3 assist in a 66–59 win over Xavier. On January 22, 2013, Miller-McIntyre scored 15 points and 3 rebounds in a 86–84 victory against NC State.

Sophomore season (2013–14) 
On November 8, 2013, Miller-McIntyre scored 21 points and 7 rebounds in a 89–78 win over Colgate. On November 12, 2013, Miller-McIntyre put up 23 points, 6 rebounds, and 7 assist in a 98–71 victory against VMI.

Professional career

After going undrafted in the 2016 NBA Draft, Miller-McIntyre signed his first professional contract with Leuven Bears on August 10, 2016. He led the Belgian league in both scoring and assists. On July 13, 2017, Miller-McIntyre signed with Parma Basket of the VTB United League. He averaged 16 points, five rebounds and eight assists per game and earned VTB United League All-Star honors. While in Perm, he visited several schools and helped teach English.

On August 1, 2018, Miller-McIntyre signed with the Dallas Mavericks. He was then waived during training camp. He was added to the Mavericks’ NBA G League affiliate, the Texas Legends.

On November 24, 2018, Miller-McIntyre returned to Russia to sign with Zenit Saint Petersburg. On July 22, 2019, Miller-McIntyre signed a one-year contract with Slovenian club Cedevita Olimpija.

On July 1, 2020, Miller-McIntyre signed with Partizan of the ABA League.

On February 28, 2021, Miller-McIntyre signed with JL Bourg of LNB Pro A.

On July 13, 2021, Miller-McIntyre signed with MoraBanc Andorra of the Spanish Liga ACB.

On August 1, 2022, he has signed with Gaziantep Basketbol of the Basketbol Süper Ligi.

In January 2023, Codi accepted an invite to join the Bulgarian national team.

References

External links
Wake Forest Demon Deacons bio

1994 births
Living people
ABA League players
American expatriate basketball people in Andorra
American expatriate basketball people in Belgium
American expatriate basketball people in France
American expatriate basketball people in Russia
American expatriate basketball people in Serbia
American expatriate basketball people in Slovenia
American expatriate basketball people in Spain
American men's basketball players
Bulgarian men's basketball players
Bulgarian people of American descent
Bulgarian expatriate basketball people in Turkey
Basketball players from North Carolina
BC Andorra players
BC Zenit Saint Petersburg players
Expatriate basketball people in Andorra
Gaziantep Basketbol players
JL Bourg-en-Bresse players
KK Cedevita Olimpija players
KK Partizan players
Leuven Bears players
Liga ACB players
Parma Basket players
People from Concord, North Carolina
Point guards
Sportspeople from High Point, North Carolina
Texas Legends players
Wake Forest Demon Deacons men's basketball players